Jatayu Airlines (Jatayu Gelang Sejahtera) was an airline based in Jakarta,  Indonesia. It operated domestic and international services from Jakarta and was established in 2000. Its main base was Soekarno-Hatta International Airport, Jakarta. On 26 June 2007, The Indonesian Transportation Ministry discontinued the airline's Aircraft Operator Certificate because of "the management's inability to consistently apply flight safety measurements as stipulated."

History
Jatayu Airlines was founded in 2000 and ceased operations in 2007.

Destinations

Domestic
 Banda Aceh - Sultan Iskandar Muda International Airport
 Batam - Hang Nadim Airport
 Jakarta Soekarno-Hatta International Airport - main hub
 Medan Polonia International Airport - focus city
 Palembang - Sultan Mahmud Badaruddin II International Airport
 Pangkal Pinang - Depati Amir Airport
 Pekanbaru - Sultan Syarif Qasim II International Airport

International
 Penang - Penang International Airport

Fleet

Previously operated
In August 2005 the airline also operated:
5 Boeing 737-200

By 2005, only 5 737-200 were active as the airline retired all 727s in that year prior to closure in 2007.

References

External links
Jatayu Airlines (no longer online)

Defunct airlines of Indonesia
Airlines established in 2000
Airlines disestablished in 2007
2007 disestablishments in Indonesia
Indonesian companies established in 2000